Sheykh Musa Rural District is a rural district (dehestan) in the Central District of Aqqala County, Golestan Province, Iran. At the 2006 census, its population was 12,909, in 2,621 families.  The rural district has 16 villages.

References 

Rural Districts of Golestan Province
Aqqala County